Ek Chitthi Pyar Bhari is a 1985 Hindi drama film, starring Raj Babbar and Reena Roy and directed by Vijay Sadanah.

Cast

 Raj Babbar as Dr. Sunil Sharma
 Reena Roy as Aarti Saxena
 Sulochana Latkar as Mrs. Sharma
 Chaman Puri as Aarti's Father-in-law
 Lalita Kumari as Aarti's Mother-in-law
 Baby Bulbul as Bulbul
Raviraaj as Chandmama , in Bulbul dream
Manmohan Krishna as Milkman 
 Dhumal as Sadhuram
 Jayshree T as Sadhuram's daughter
 Jagdeep as Murugan
 C. S. Dubey as Bhiku
 Seema Deo as Hostel Manager
 Ramesh Deo as Kamalnath
 Birbal as Kanha
 Yunus Parvez as Khan Pathan
 Mohan Choti as Traffic Police Constable

Songs
Lyricist: Indeevar, Verma Malik

"Yeh Hamari Tumari Khaani, Is Khaani Me Na Raaja Rani" - Asha Bhosle
"Shadi Karke Bhi Mai Hu Kawaanra" - Sadhana Sargam, Suresh Wadkar
"O Tune Di Aawaaz" - Asha Bhosle, Manhar Udhas
"Ek Chitthi Pyaar Bhari" - Mahendra Kapoor
"Ek Nanhi Si Ye Gudiya" - Mahendra Kapoor
"Ek Nanhi Si Ye Gudiya" (sad) - Mahendra Kapoor

External links

1980s Hindi-language films
1985 films
Films scored by Kalyanji Anandji
Indian drama films
1985 drama films
Hindi-language drama films